Rohtak Junction railway station is a main railway station in Rohtak, Haryana. Its code is ROK. The station consists of three platforms. There are many trains available for Delhi, Panipat, Rewari, Bhiwani, Jind and Hansi as well as for long-distance journey.

Rohtak is connected to Bahadur Garh through Delhi line, to Gohana through Panipat line, to Meham through Hansi line and Jhajjar through Rewari line. Delhi and Jind connections are part of the Delhi–Fazilka line, and the line is double tracked from Delhi to Bhatinda, Punjab, India, and is electrified between Delhi and Rohtak. All other lines are single track, and unelectrified. A new railway line from Rohtak to Rewari via Jhajjar became operational from January 2013.

First CNG train of India also runs between Rohtak and Rewari via Jhajjar.

References

External links

Railway stations in Rohtak district
Delhi railway division
Railway junction stations in Haryana